Karim Noureldin (born 1967 in Zurich, Switzerland) is a Swiss visual artist.

Biography 
Noureldin studied at the Zürcher Hochschule der Künste Zurich (1988–1989) and at Hochschule für Design und Kunst Basel HGK/University of Art and Design Basel (1990–1993). From 1994 - 2000 he lived in New York, after 2001 in Rome, from 2005-2006 in London and Cairo. He lives and works currently in Lausanne, Switzerland.

In 2002 he was appointed Associated Professor for Visual Arts at the University of Art and Design École cantonale d'art de Lausanne in Lausanne, Switzerland. Being member of various jury commission in art institutions, in 2017 he was appointed as supervisory board member of the Hermann and Margrit Rupf Foundation / Rupf Collection, Bern. and since 2019 also of the Theodor Bally Estate Foundation.

Work 
Around 1994 Noureldin initiated a contemporary drawing technique based on an abstract artistic vocabulary. Since then he added interventions in the field of sculptures, photos, wall and floor paintings and large site-specific installations in a variety of corporate and public environments as well as international museums and contemporary art galleries. 
He collaborated on numerous artistic projects with a younger generation of Swiss architects
as well as with corporate and cultural institutions and state agencies. Recently, collaborations with textile manufacturers from India were started, included into the artistic practice as well as ceramic practise, incorporating within the artistic practise.

Projects  
Recent projects included solo shows at von Bartha, Basel (2019), Ribot arte contemporanea, Milan (2018), Bernhard Knaus Fine Art, Frankfurt (2016), Centre d'Art Yverdon CACY (2015), KunstZeugHaus, Zurich (2015), Kunstmuseum Villa Zanders, Bergisch-Gladbach (2015), Gisela Clement Gallery, Bonn (2014, 2013, 2012) von Bartha, Basel & S-chanf (2016, 2011, 2009), Kunstmuseum Bonn (2007), 
Musée d’art moderne et contemporain MAMCO Geneva (2015, 2005), Kunstmuseum Winterthur (2004), Fri Art - Centre d'Art Contemporain (2003), Lucas Schoormans New York (2001, 1999), Kunsthalle Basel (2003, 2001), Kunstmuseum Thun (2000), the Swiss Institute New York (1997), Holly Solomon Gallery New York (1994), among others.

He participated in numerous international group shows, among others at Museum für Konkrete Kunst, Ingolstadt (2020), LWL Museum für Kunst und Kultur, Münster (2018), Aargauer Kunsthaus, Aarau (2018), Kunstmuseum Basel, Basel (2016), Musée de Cambrai, Cambrai (2016), MCBA Musée Cantonal des Beaux-Arts, Lausanne (2015 & 2019), Musée Jenisch, Vevey (2015), Museum Oskar Reinhart, Winterthurc (2015), Kunstmuseum Vaduz, Liechtenstein (2011), waterside contemporary, London (2011), Aargauer Kunsthaus, Aarau (2016, 2011), Gisela Clement Gallery, Bonn (2013, 2011), Waterside Project space, London (2010),  Musée Rath, Geneva (2010), l' Espace de l'art concret-Donation Albers-Honegger, Mouans-Sartoux, France (2008), Forde - Espace d'art contemporain, Geneva (2007), The Drawing Room, London (2007), CAN - Centre d’Art, Neuchatel (2006), Helmhaus, Zurich (2005), Kunstmuseum Thun (2003), CAN - Centre d’Art, Neuchatel (2003), Kunstmuseum Solothurn (2004), Margaretha Roeder Gallery, New York, Fri-Art - Centre d'Art Contemporain Fribourg (2002), 
Kunsthalle Basel (2001), Kunstmuseum Basel, (1999),  The Swiss Institute New York (1997)

Since 2004, he has collaborated with numerous international architect firms such as: Herzog&deMeuron architects, Basel, Müller Sigrist architects, Zurich, Make architects, London  among others.

Literature 
Monographic literature:
 
 
 
 Wechsler, Max (2004). AIRE - Zeichnung/Raum/Welt: zu den Arbeiten von Karim  Noureldin - Kunstmuseum Winterthur - MAMCO Musée d'art moderne et contemporain, Geneva  
 
  

 Koepplin, Dieter (1997). Karim Noureldin - Die Frage nach dem denkbaren Ganzen - The Swiss Institute New York

Secondary literature:

References

External links 
Artist's homepage 

Swiss contemporary artists
Living people
Zurich University of the Arts alumni
1967 births